Ang Lihim ni Annasandra (International title: The Secret of Annasandra) is a Philippine television drama fantasy series broadcast by GMA Network. Directed by Albert Langitan, it stars Andrea Torres in the title role. It premiered on October 6, 2014 on the network's Afternoon Prime line up. The series concluded on February 6, 2015 with a total of 88 episodes. It was replaced by Kailan Ba Tama ang Mali? in its timeslot.

The series is streaming online on YouTube.

Premise
Annasandra is the daughter of Belinda and Carlos. Events will lead to Annasandra to be cursed as an "awok". Her loved ones keep her real identity a secret to protect her from being misjudged, from being hurt and hurting other people.

Cast and characters

Lead cast
 Andrea Torres as Annasandra  Vergara

Supporting cast
 Mikael Daez as William Benitez
 Rochelle Pangilinan as Esmeralda Salvador
 Pancho Magno as Enrico Sanchez
 Glydel Mercado as Belinda Vergara
 Emilio Garcia as Carlos Vergara
 Maria Isabel Lopez as Rosario Salvador
 Joyce Burton as Hazel Benitez
 Erika Padilla as Rebecca "Becca" Sanchez
 Arthur Solinap as Kenneth Gabriel
 Cris Villonco as Lorraine Armada

Guest cast
 Mike Lloren as Enrico's father 
 Barbara Miguel as Annicka "Nikay" Sanchez
 Glenda Garcia as Enrico's mother
 Chinggoy Alonzo as Don Wilfredo Armada
 Juan Rodrigo as Jojo Salvador
 AJ Dee as Alex Benitez
 Winwyn Marquez as Tiana
 Mon Confiado as Dalik
 Dianne Hernandez as Stella
 Arianne Bautista as reporter
 Rocco Nacino as Reneé
 Karel Marquez as Cecilia
 Gabriel de Leon as Jimmy 
 Mercedes Cabral as Saling
 Joko Diaz as Emong
 Mega Unciano as Mikee
 Tess Bomb as Myrna

Ratings
According to AGB Nielsen Philippines' Mega Manila household television ratings, the pilot episode of Ang Lihim ni Annasandra earned a 14.3% rating. While the final episode scored a 17.4% rating.

Accolades

References

External links
 
 

2014 Philippine television series debuts
2015 Philippine television series endings
Fantaserye and telefantasya
Filipino-language television shows
GMA Network drama series
Television shows set in Manila